Gédéon Pitard (born February 7, 1989) is a Cameroonian professional basketball player for Antibes Sharks of LNB Pro B.

After six seasons in STB Le Havre, he joined Le Mans Sarthe for two seasons. After being cut by the club Sarthois, he signed on July 1, 2016 for the club  Elan Chalon. Pitard joined Châlons-Reims in June 2017.

References 

1989 births
Living people
Cameroonian expatriate basketball people in France
Cameroonian men's basketball players
Champagne Châlons-Reims Basket players
Élan Chalon players
Le Mans Sarthe Basket players
Olympique Antibes basketball players
People from Littoral Region (Cameroon)
Point guards
STB Le Havre players